Karen LeBlanc is a Canadian film, television and musical theatre actress.

Early life
LeBlanc grew up in Tottenham, Ontario to family from Nova Scotia. She attended the musical theatre program at Sheridan College.

Career
Starting with a minor role in the 1992 television movie Split Images, LeBlanc's credits include guest appearances in television series including
Trailer Park Boys, Producing Parker, Soul Food, Mutant X, and most notable The Playboy Club (2011) playing Tina Turner and singing two of Turner's signature songs, "Shake a Tail Feather" and "I Want to Be Made Over". As regular, she first starred in the final season of the CBC sitcom Material World from 1992 to 1993. She appeared in 2000 fantasy-comedy film Santa Who? starring Leslie Nielsen. She co-starred in a number of made-for-television movies, including Snap Decision (2001), Guilt by Association (2002), Lucky Day (2002), Martha: Behind Bars (2005), Knights of the South Bronx (2005), and Battlestar Galactica: Blood & Chrome (2012). On stage, she has appeared in productions of Outrageous!, Rent. and Cinderella. She has also performed as a backing vocalist for Chaka Khan, Rik Emmett and Glass Tiger.

LeBlanc starred in the short-lived the CW drama series Runaway in 2006. For her recurring role in ReGenesis, she was nominated for Gemini Awards for Best Performance by an Actress in a Guest Role, Dramatic Series in 2008. In 2009, LeBlanc received positive reviews and Canadian Screen Award for Best Actress nomination for her performance in the drama film Nurse.Fighter.Boy. Her other film credits include Make It Happen (2008) and Dolan's Cadillac (2009). Also that year, she starred in the ABC drama series, Defying Gravity. Her other series regular credits including Soul (2009), Shattered (2010–11), Cracked (2013), Insomnia (2018), Frontier (2017–18), and Ransom (2018-19). She also had a recurring roles in Motive, Trailer Park Boys  and Killjoys. As regular, LeBlanc starred on the second season of Peacock series Departure in 2021, and in 2022 starring in the Oprah Winfrey Network prime time soap opera The Kings of Napa.

She was a Canadian Screen Award nominee for Best Lead Performance in a Web Program or Series at the 10th Canadian Screen Awards in 2022 for the web series For the Record.

Awards and nominations

References

External links

Canadian film actresses
Canadian television actresses
Canadian musical theatre actresses
Canadian voice actresses
Black Canadian actresses
Living people
Year of birth missing (living people)